SeaWorld San Diego is an animal theme park, oceanarium, outside aquarium and marine mammal park, in San Diego, California, United States located inside Mission Bay Park. It is owned and operated by SeaWorld Parks & Entertainment.

SeaWorld San Diego is a member of the Association of Zoos and Aquariums (AZA). Adjacent to the property is the Hubbs-SeaWorld Research Institute, which conducts research on marine biology and provides education and outreach on marine issues to the general public, including information in park exhibits.

History 

SeaWorld is located on San Diego's Mission Bay. SeaWorld was founded on March 21,1964, by four graduates of the University of California, Los Angeles. Although their original idea of an underwater restaurant was not feasible at the time, the idea was expanded into a  marine zoological park along the shore of Mission Bay in San Diego. After an investment of about $1.5 million, the park opened with 45 employees, several dolphins, sea lions and two seawater aquariums. It successfully hosted more than 400,000 visitors in its first year of operation.

Initially held as a private partnership, SeaWorld offered its stock publicly in 1968 enabling it to expand and open additional parks. The second SeaWorld location, SeaWorld Ohio, opened in 1970, followed by SeaWorld Orlando in 1973, and SeaWorld San Antonio (the largest of the parks) in 1988. The partnership later sold SeaWorld Ohio to Six Flags in January 2001. Harcourt Brace Jovanovich owned the parks between 1976 and 1989, when Anheuser-Busch Companies, Inc. purchased them. After InBev acquired Anheuser-Busch, it sold SeaWorld San Diego and the rest of the company's theme parks to the Blackstone Group in December 2009, which operates the park through its SeaWorld Parks & Entertainment division.

SeaWorld currently leases the land from the City of San Diego with the lease expiring in 2048. The premises must be used as a marine mammal park and no other marine mammal park may be operated by SeaWorld within 560 miles of the City limits.

The park was closed between March 16, 2020, and April 12, 2021, in response to the COVID-19 pandemic and two stay-at-home orders issued by California Governor Gavin Newsom.

Attractions

Shows
Many of SeaWorld's shows are seasonal and may change based on the time of year.

 Orca Encounter: a show highlighting the park's killer whales and various aspects of their lives.
 Dolphin Adventures: guests can meet the Whale & Dolphin family and learn what inspires their trainers. The name change simply came after the remodeling of the stage. It is still the same format as Dolphin Days
 Sea Lion and Otter Spotlight: a brand new educational presentation that replaces Sea Lions Live, featuring California sea lions and Asian small-clawed otters.
 Sea Rescue: an indoor theater that shows episodes of the television series of the same name, which follows marine rescue efforts.
 Cirque Electrique: a summertime evening show featuring world-class acrobatic performers. Formerly known as Cirque de la Mer, it is performed Wednesday through Sunday as part of the park's Electric Ocean event.

Rides

Bayside Skyride
Bayside Skyride is a 1967 VonRoll type 101 gondola ride located in the northwest corner of the park behind the Bayside Amphitheater. It travels over Perez Cove for a 6-minute ride on two  towers and lands on the other side before returning for a full loop. Bayside Skyride has the longest span between towers out of any VonRoll Skyride ever built—. From 1967 to 1988, the Skyride was known as the Sea World Atlantis Skyride and took riders to the Sea World Atlantis Restaurant which was located on the opposite end of the ride across the lagoon. After the restaurant closed, the ride remained, but took riders on a full loop, passing through the second station instead of stopping.

Ocean Explorer
Ocean Explorer is a kids' realm that opened on May 27, 2017. The area includes four rides: Aqua Scout, a ride that bounces in mini submarines,  Octarock, a swing that rocks back and forth, Sea Dragon Drop, a child-size drop tower and Tentacle Twirl, a jellyfish-themed wave swing ride. This addition also features an original 45 minute orchestral soundtrack by composer, Rick McKee.

The realm originally featured Submarine Quest, an outdoor people mover-like ride with indoor segments, themed around deep sea exploration. The ride cars featured a touchscreen dashboard that contained minigames and interactions during the ride. Amid negative reviews, the ride only began to operate intermittently after the summer season, and quietly closed indefinitely in 2018 with little fanfare. SeaWorld staff initially indicated that Submarine Quest had been temporarily closed for maintenance, but by May 2018 references to the ride had been removed from SeaWorld's maps and website. When the park re-opened on April 13, 2021, demolition of the ride track and show buildings began, leaving the animal enclosures intact.

Riptide Rescue
Located outside Turtle Reef, Riptide Rescue is a spinning flat ride, with the vehicles being themed to SeaWorld's rescue boats.

Sesame Street's Bay of Play
Sesame Street's Bay of Play is an interactive children's play area that opened in 2008 and is based on the long running Sesame Street children's television series. The area includes three rides: Abby's Seastar Spin, a spinning "teacup" attraction, Elmo's Flying Fish, an attraction in the style of Dumbo the Flying Elephant" and Oscar's Rockin' Eel, an eel themed "Tug Boat" ride.

Shipwreck Rapids

Shipwreck Rapids is an Intamin river rapids ride themed as a shipwreck on a deserted island. At one point riders pass by a sea turtle exhibit. There is also a point where riders go underneath a waterfall into a cavern.

Skytower
Skytower is a  Gyro tower that was built in 1968 by Sansei Yusoki. The ride was refurbished in 2007 with a new capsule. The ride gives passengers a six-minute view of SeaWorld and San Diego. It rises at a rate of  while spinning slowly (1.02 rpm).

Roller coasters

Electric Eel

Opened on May 10, 2018, Electric Eel is a Sky Rocket II model by Premier Rides.

Journey to Atlantis

Journey to Atlantis is a Mack Rides water coaster that was built in 2004.

Emperor

Emperor is a Dive Coaster manufactured by Bolliger & Mabillard. With a height of 153 ft, Emperor is the tallest, fastest and longest Dive Coaster in California. The ride opened on March 12, 2022.

Manta

On May 26, 2012, SeaWorld San Diego opened a new mega-attraction called Manta, a Mack launched roller coaster featuring two launches LSM of up to  accompanied by a bat ray aquarium and touch pool. A shallow pool for touching bat rays, white sturgeons, and shovelnose guitarfish lies at the entrance of the attraction, while the two-sided underground aquarium (for riders and nonriders) can be accessed downstairs or via the queue. Manta begins with a 270 degree projected media experience at the first launch. The train rocks forward and backward in synchronization with the projected film of a coral reef and school of rays. The layout is characterized by multiple turns, short but sudden drops and crossovers.

Tidal Twister
Tidal Twister is a Skywarp Horizon model by Skyline Attractions. Tidal Twister is the first Skywarp Horizon and is the second coaster manufactured by Skyline. The ride was opened on May 24, 2019.

Animal exhibits

Aquariums
SeaWorld San Diego is home to 19 aquariums. Each aquarium houses different types of aquatic animals, both fresh and saltwater.

Ocean Explorer Aquarium: This aquarium is home to a variety of marine animals including Moray eels, Octopuses, and Japanese spider crabs.

Ray Aquarium: Located adjacent to Journey to Atlantis, this aquarium features a variety of rays and fishes.

Explorer's Reef
Opened on March 21, 2014, Explorer's Reef is an attraction that contains animal attractions and structures. Featuring four different touch pools, Explorer's Reef gives guests the opportunity to interact with a variety of fishes, including 400 Brownbanded bamboo sharks and white-spotted bamboo sharks, and more than 4,000 Cleaner fishes and horseshoe crabs.

Dolphins

There are three species of dolphins at SeaWorld San Diego: common dolphin hybrid, Atlantic, and Pacific bottlenose dolphins. Pacific & Atlantic short-finned pilot whales also live at Dolphin Amphitheater. The parks dolphins rotate between the Dolphin Amphitheater, Dolphin Point, and Animal Care as their needs change.

Killer whales

SeaWorld's main attraction is its collection of killer whales, eight of which are housed in San Diego in a 7 million gallon habitat. Shamu was the name of the first killer whale brought to SeaWorld San Diego in 1965. "Shamu" is now used as the character name for the costume character at the park entrance. SeaWorld San Diego ended their theatrical Killer Whale shows in San Diego in January 2017. San Diego was the first of the three SeaWorld parks to premiere "Orca Encounter," an educational presentation that gives insight into various aspects of a killer whale's life.

Wild Arctic
SeaWorld's Wild Arctic is home to various species of cold water animals, including beluga whales, a walrus, and sea otters.

Seals & Sea Lions

SeaWorld San Diego houses California sea lions in both its Sea Lion Point exhibit, as well as Sea Lion & Otter Amphitheater.

Attendance

Sesame Place (San Diego)

SeaWorld Entertainment purchased one of the Cedar Fair-owned "Knott's Soak City" water parks in late 2012. In 2013, the water park was opened as Aquatica San Diego. The park features 26 slides. On October 21, 2019, SeaWorld Entertainment announced that Aquatica San Diego would be converted into Sesame Place, the first Sesame Place theme park on the West Coast. Aquatica San Diego closed its final season in September 2021, and was re-opened as Sesame Place San Diego, on March 26, 2022. The new park retained the water park attractions from Aquatica San Diego.

See also

Incidents at SeaWorld parks

References

External links

 
Buildings and structures in San Diego
Event venues established in 1964
Oceanaria in the United States
1964 establishments in California
SeaWorld Parks & Entertainment
Tourist attractions in San Diego
Zoos in California
Amusement parks in California
Landmarks in San Diego
Zoos established in 1964
Amusement parks opened in 1964